Chuno may refer to the following:

Chuño, a freeze-dried potato product traditionally made by Quechua and Aymara communities of Peru and Bolivia
Chūnō, the central portion of Gifu Prefecture in the Chūbu region of Japan
Chuno, a 2010 Korean drama also known as The Slave Hunters,